Marmaton Township is a township in Bourbon County, Kansas, USA.  As of the 2000 census, its population was 815.

History
Marmaton is a corruption of Marmiton, a French name given by fur traders meaning "scullion".

Geography
According to the USGS, it contains two cemeteries: Marmaton and Woods.

The largest section of scenic Hollister Wildlife Area, containing portions of Pawnee Creek and Elm Creek, is located in the south. Bunion Creek, Cedar Creek, Chambers Branch, Paint Creek and Robinson Branch also run through the township.

Transportation
Marmaton Township is the site of Fort Scott Municipal Airport, a municipally-owned general aviation airport and landing strip.

Further reading

References

 USGS Geographic Names Information System (GNIS)

External links
 City-Data.com
 Bourbon County Maps: Current, Historic Collection

Townships in Bourbon County, Kansas
Townships in Kansas